The September 2018 inter-Korean summit was the third and final inter-Korean summit in the 2018-19 Korean peace process.

On 13 August, the Blue House announced that South Korea's President plans to attend the third inter-Korean summit with leader Kim Jong-un at Pyongyang in September as expected.  The agenda was finding the strategy of the breakthrough in its hampered talks with the United States and solution for the denuclearization on the Korean Peninsula.  It was held for three days between 18 September and 20 September.

Overview 
It would be the fifth inter-Korean summit after the Korean War of 1950–1953. North Korea is currently soliciting economic cooperation and results from South Korea at the upcoming inter-Korean summit on September. North Korea's state media announced the agreement to hold the next inter-Korean summit in Pyongyang.

Progress 
It was announced on 31 August that South Korean President Moon Jae-In will send a special delegation to North Korea on 5 September to hold more nuclear talks and set up the date for the summit. On 5 September 2018, South Korean National Security Advisor Chung Eui-yong, National Intelligence Service Director Suh Hoon and other delegates travelled to North Korea to hold a meeting with Kim Jong-un, where they arranged the summit and help rescue faltering nuclear diplomacy between the United States and North Korea. It was then announced that the three-day summit would take place between 18 September and 20 September. South Korean officials have insisted that Kim Jong-un has set a proposed denuclearization timetable and is working with Trump to achieve this goal.

18 September (Day 1)
The summit began as scheduled on 18 September. On the first day, Moon Jae-in and his wife Kim Jung-Sook arrived at Pyongyang's Sunan International Airport, where they got a rousing reception, which featured a marchpast by the guard of honor and the Central Military Band of the Korean People's Army.  Kim Jong-un also greeted them and embraced Moon. Kim and Moon also arrived at the summit in the same car. Both also openly waved to an enthusiastic car parade.

19 September (Day 2)
In Pyongyang, an agreement titled the "" was signed by both Korean leaders The agreement calls for a military agreement, civilian exchanges and cooperation in many areas, and conditions to denuclearize North Korea. During this day, North Korean Defense Minister No Kwang Chol and South Korean Defense Minister Song Young-moo also signed a new Agreement on Reconciliation, Non-Aggression, Exchanges and Cooperation (aka "Basic Agreement") known as the "Agreement on the Implementation of the Historic Panmunjom Declaration in the Military Domain" (also called the Comprehensive Military Agreement, or CMA) to help ensure less military tension between both countries and greater arms control. The agreement calls for the removal of landmines, guard posts, weapons, and personnel in the JSA from both sides of the North-South Korean border. The agreement also called for the creation of joint military buffer zones.

The DPRK agreed to dismantle its nuclear complex in the presence of international experts if the U.S. takes correlative action. The DPRK also agreed to complete its dismantling of the Sohae Satellite Launching Station, which started in July 2018, and that the dismantling of Sohae's missile engine test site and launch pad would be observed by international experts as well.

Kim Jong-un also pledged to visit the South Korean capital of Seoul "in the near future."

In front of a capacity crowd of 150,000, Moon delivered a speech at Pyongyang's May Day Stadium calling for cultural unity and reunification of both Koreas. Moon received a standing ovation and was the first ever South Korean leader to give a public address in North Korea.  At the same stadium, Moon, North Korean leader Kim Jong Un and their wives attended the mass games performance of "The Glorious Country."

20 September (Day 3)
The leaders of the two Koreas visited Mount Paektu together. Moon traveled from Pyongyang by plane to Samjiyon Airport near Mount Paektu where Kim arrived first to greet him. They then rode vehicles to the mountain on the North Korean-Chinese border. The leaders also rode together in a cable car to reach Heaven Lake, located in a crater atop the mountain's sacred volcano area. Moon was the first South Korean President to visit Mount Paektu. After reaching the lake, Kim and Moon, along with their wives, posed together in front of it for a picture. The mountain's volcano and Heaven Lake is considered to be the most sacred sites in Korean mythology and Kim's family has long identified themselves as the "Mount Paektu bloodline." Before Moon returned to South Korea, a stone marker was dedicated during a tree planting ceremony in Pyongyang to commemorate his trip to North Korea.

Kim also shipped two tons of North Korean pine mushrooms, known locally as songyi, across the border before Moon returned as well. Moon press secretary Yoon Young-chan stated that the mushrooms would be given to 4,000 South Koreans who had family members in North Korea. Senior citizens in this group also had the privilege of eating 500 grams each before the Chuseok festival.

Reactions 
Chinese state media Xinhua greeted the decision of holding the next inter-Korea leaders' summit in Pyongyang. Xinhua expressed that the U.S. has had a vital impact on the "Korean Peninsula issue" and requested on Washington to play a more dynamic role in regional matters. Xinhua also viewed negatively the United States' North Korea policy with "maximum pressure" although Pyongyang has made efforts to "shut down" the Punggye-ri primary nuclear test site, return the remains of the U.S. soldiers from the Korean War, and stimulate negotiations between North and South. On 19 September, Chinese Foreign Ministry spokesman Geng Shuang praised the meeting, stating that it produced positive effects easing military tensions, promoting peace talks and the progressing denuclearization process.

Aftermath

Gifts
On 27 September 2018, Kim honored a request Moon made during the summit and gave the South Korean leader two rare Pungsans, Korean hunting dogs, named Gomi and Songgang. On 8 November 2018, Moon's office declared the mushrooms safe to eat and were not affected by North Korea's history of nuclear testing. On 11 November 2018, South Korea airlifted 200 tons of tangerines to North Korea from Jeju Island as a goodwill gesture for the mushrooms. On 12 November 2018, Gomi, the female Pungsan, gave birth to six "peace gift" puppies.  When they were born, Moon tweeted "As the pregnancy period of dogs is about two months, Gomi must have come to us pregnant," and that "I hope inter-Korean affairs will be like this."  On 25 November 2018, Moon presented photos of these "peace gift" puppies to the public.

Kim's visit to Seoul
It was announced that DPRK leader Kim Jong-un's visit to Seoul would occur in December 2018 based on the report from South Korea’s Yonhap news agency.

The meeting during UN General Assembly 
Moon Jae-in at UN members requests world to acknowledge ‘positively’ to Kim Jong-un’s ‘new choices’ to inspire denuclearisation. US Secretary of State Mike Pompeo earlier assembled with his North Korean counterpart Foreign Minister Ri Yong-ho in New York and announced that it's very positive gathering with DPRK  during UNGA (General Assembly) to discuss upcoming Trump-Kim summit & next steps toward denuclearization of North Korea.

Removal of landmines and discovery of remains of Korean War soldiers
On 1 October 2018, North and South Korean military engineers began a scheduled 20 day removal process of landmines and other explosives planted across the Joint Security Area of the Korean Demilitarized Zone (DMZ). The Joint Security Area, located near the shared border village of Panmunjom, will also undergo major changes following the demining as well. It was also agreed that Arrowhead Hill would afterwards undergo demining by both North and South Korean forces and that they would also assist in searching for potential remains of missing soldiers.  Around 800,000 landmines were planted along these two regions since the division of Korea.  On 19 October 2018, after just 19 days of mine clearing operations by both sides, the United Nations Command announced that both North and South Korea had completed work to remove landmines from the Joint Security Area.

By 25 October 2018, demining had begun at Arrowhead Hill and resulted in the discovery of Korean War remains. Demining at Arrowhead Hill will continue until 30 November 2018. Five more sets of remains from the Korean were discovered at Arrowhead Hill on 19 November 2018. By this point in time, a total of nine sets of Korean War remains had been discovered at Arrowhead Hill Arrowhead Hill had previously been selected for both Koreas to conduct a pilot remains recovery project. A pilot inter-Korean Remains Recovery Project is another commitment which was made in the summit's Comprehensive Military Agreement. On 22 November 2018, a DMZ road was reconnected for the first time in fourteen years in an effort to assist with both the demining and exhumation process.

Work between both Koreas to remove landmines from Arrowhead Hill was completed on 30 November 2018.

Dismantling of guard posts
Once the Joint Security Area is demined, the guard posts will cease to exist. The dismantling of Joint Security Area guard posts was complete on 25 October.

The destruction of 20 guard posts located along the "front lines" of the Korean DMZ officially began on 11 November 2018. On 15 November 2018, destruction of two DMZ guard posts, one being located in South Korea and the other located in North Korea, was completed. Work was still ongoing to complete the destruction of other guard posts as well. On 23 November, it was revealed that South Korea had slowly been destroying their guard posts with excavators. As destruction of the guard posts began, it was announced that both Koreas had amended the summit's Comprehensive Military Agreement and decided to preserve two of the twenty-two demilitarized frontline guard posts, one on each side of the  border.

On 20 November 2018, North Korea, hoping to further ease tensions with South Korea, destroyed all of their 10 remaining "frontline" guard posts. The South Korean Defense Ministry released photos confirming this and also released a statement stating that North Korea had informed them about the plans to demolish them before it took place. This came in accordance with the earlier summit agreements. On 30 November 2018, both Koreas completed work to dismantle 10 of their "frontline" guard posts.  The later agreement for each Korea to preserve one "frontline" post was upheld as well. The "frontline" guard post which was preserved on the North Korean side of the DMZ was visited by Kim Jong Un in 2013 when tensions were rising between both Koreas.  The destruction of the 10 guard posts and disarmament and destruction of underground structures at all 11 guard posts were confirmed by inter-Korean inspections which took place when inspectors and soldiers from both Koreas crossed into the opposite countries on 12 December 2018.

Disarmament
The Joint Security Area will no longer be armed with weapons of any kind after it is demined as well. Official disarmament of this area is complete on 25 October. Removal of weapons from all of the DMZ's 22 "frontline" guard posts was complete on 10 November 2018.

Withdrawal of personnel
Any military personnel, regardless of their country, who is stationed at the Joint Security Area on either side of the border will be forced to withdraw when demining is complete. On 25 October 2018, Personnel was replaced with 35 unarmed security guards. Withdrawal of military personnel from all of the DMZ's 22 "frontline" guard posts was complete on 10 November 2018.

Inter-Korean Liaison Office
The first meeting at the Inter-Korean Liaison Office occurred between delegates from both Koreas on 22 October 2018. The meeting concerned, among other things, forestry cooperation between both Koreas. Forest ecology cooperation was one of the commitments in the Pyongyang Declaration. A meeting later took place at the office between South Korean Vice Minister of Culture, Sports and Tourism Roh Tae-kang and North Korean Vice-Minister of Physical Culture and Sports Won Kil U on 2 November 2018, talks at the office resulted in agreements for a unified Korean team at the 2020 Olympics and to hold the 2032 Summer Olympics in both Koreas. Another meeting was held on 2 November 2018 between South Korean Vice Unification Minister Chun Hae-sung and his North Korean counterpart, Jon Jong-su. Both men are co-heads of the office and each serve as liaison chief for their perspective country. Both Chun and Jon discussed cooperation in various joint-Korean projects. Following the meeting, it was reported that inter-Korean on-site railway inspections and a performance by a Pyongyang art troupe in Seoul were issues which remained unresolved. A North Korean art troupe previously performed in Seoul and another South Korean city shortly before the 2018 Winter Olympics.

Health cooperation

On 7 November 2018, health officials from North and South Korea held talks at the Inter-Korean Liaison Office to discuss health care cooperation Greater cooperation between both countries in the field of health care was another one of the commitments in Pyongyang Declaration. On December 11, 2018, it was revealed that both Koreas agreed to jointly fight infectious diseases. By February 2019, South Korean doctor Kim Young-hoon, who previously made history by traveling to Pyongyang in 2000 to perform pacemaker surgery, was working in both Koreas to expand health care and medical facilities. He has been head of the Inter-Korea Foundation for Health and Medical Education since it was founded in August 2015.

Joint Celebration of 4 October Declaration
On 4 October 2018, Pyongyang allowed a South Korean delegation to participate in a joint celebration of the 11th anniversary of the 4 October Declaration. This event also commemorated the 100th anniversary of the March 1st Movement and was one of the commitments in the Pyongyang Declaration.

Ratification of summit agreements
On 23 October 2018, Moon ratified both the Pyongyang Declaration and the CMA just hours after they were approved by his cabinet. Following the approval, it was acknowledged that the South Korean Constitution allows the President to approve treaties without consent from the National Assembly so long as they do not "give huge financial burdens to the people."

Restoration of Economic Cooperation
On 30 October 2018, members of a South Korean ad hoc parliamentary special committee on inter-Korean economic cooperation held its first meeting and saw members of both the ruling and opposition parties agree to restore inter-Korean economic cooperation which has ceased for about 10 years and to normalize operations of the now-shuttered North Korean Kaesong Industrial Region and the suspended joint tour project on Mount Kumgang, also located in the North, when conditions are met. Joint economic zones in these two areas were also commitments of the Pyongyang Declaration.

Failure to uphold October commitments
Some commitments of the Pyongyang Declaration which had been scheduled to be held in October 2018 were not upheld. Among them were a joint survey for a cross-border railway and sports and health meetings to bolster exchange in the respective areas. A Pyongyang art troupe also did not hold a scheduled performance in Seoul. The Pyongyang Declaration called for a Pyongyang art troupe to hold a performance in Seoul sometime in October 2018 as well.

South Korean observation of North Korean WMD Program
On 31 October 2018, Kim Min-ki of the ruling Democratic Party issued a statement revealing that officials from South Korea's National Intelligence Service had observed several of North Korea's nuclear and missile test sites and that they were now ready for the upcoming international inspections. Kim also stated the now inactive Punggye-ri Nuclear Test Site and the Sohae Satellite Launching Station were included in these observations. The visit by the intelligence officials was also meant to make preparations for the international experts to observe the dismantling of the North Korean nuclear and missile test sites as well. The international experts will also be allowed to witness the dismantling of other North Korean nuclear and missile test sites as well.  Yongbyon, the last nuclear facility in North Korea which has yet to be closed, has also been inactive during the past year as well.

Buffer, no-fly, and peace zones established
On 1 November 2018, officials from the South Korea's Ministry of Defense confirmed that buffer zones were established across the DMZ by the North and South Korean militaries. In compliance with Comprehensive Military Agreement, the buffer zones help ensure that both Koreas will ban hostility on land, sea and air. The buffer zones stretch from the north of Deokjeok Island to the south of Cho Island in the West Sea and the north of Sokcho city and south of Tongchon County in the East (Yellow) Sea. Both North and South Korea are prohibited from conducting live-fire artillery drills and regiment-level field maneuvering exercises or those by bigger units within 5 kilometers of the Military Demarcation Line (MDL). No-fly zones have also been established along the DMZ to ban the operation of drones, helicopters and other aircraft over an area up to 40 km away from the MDL. Both Koreas also established "peace zones" near their disputed Yellow Sea border. A buffer zone was also established in the Yellow Sea's Northern Limit Line (NLL).

Establishment of Joint Utilization Zones along Han and Imjin River estuaries
On 4 November 2018, a 20-member team consisting of 10 people from North Korea and 10 people from South Korea began a joint inter-Korean survey which will lead to the development Joint Utilization Zones along the Han and Imjin River estuaries. The Zones will allow civilians to access the estuary for tourism, ecological protection and the collection of construction aggregate under the protection of militaries from both sides of the Korean border. The establish of this Joint Utilization  Zone and a joint survey beforehand is one of the objectives of the Comprehensive Military Agreement On 5 November 2018, the councils of South Korea's Gangwon and Gyeonggi provinces, which border the DMZ, signed a "peace working agreement" at Dorasan Station in Paju, giving local approval to various DMZ's projects, including the Joint Utilization Zones.

The inter-Korean survey of the estuaries in the Han and Imjin Rivers was completed on 9 December 2018. It was announced afterwards that 21 new reefs had been discovered during the joint survey and that the new maps for both of the rivers' estuaries will be made public by 25 January 2019.

Unified sports bids
In October 2018, both Koreas participated as a united team at the 2018 Asian Para Games. On 4 October 2018, it was announced that both Koreas would also participate as a unified team at the 2019 World Men's Handball Championship as well. On 2 November 2018, officials from both North and South Korea announced that their countries would participate at the 2020 Summer Olympics, held in Tokyo, Japan, as a unified team. The officials from both Koreas also announced that the letters they would send to the International Olympic Committee (IOC) regarding their bids for hosting the 2032 Summer Olympics would also consist of co-host bids so that the Olympic activities would take place in both nations if their bids were accepted as well. Participation as a united team in the 2020 Summer Olympics and other international games, as well as the bid for both Koreas to co-host 2032 Summer Olympic Games, were obligations which were agreed to in the Pyongyang Declaration. On 26 November 2018, the Unesco accepted a joint bid by North and South Korea and granted world cultural heritage status to Korean wrestling. The sport, which consists of traditional wrestling, is known in South Korea as Ssireum and in North Korea as Ssirum.

Inter-Korean transportation
On 14 October 2018, North and South Korea, agreed to meet the summit's goal of restoring railway and road transportation which had been cut since the Korean War by either late November or early December 2018. On 22 November 2018, North and South Korea completed construction to connect a three kilometer road along the DMZ. This road, which crosses the MDL Korean land border, consists of 1.7 km in South Korea and 1.3 km in North Korea. The road was reconnected for the first time in 14 years in an effort to assist with a process at the DMZ's Arrowhead Hill involving the removal of landmines and exhumation of Korean War remains.

On 24 November 2018, it was announced that the UN Security Council had granted South Korea exemptions from sanctions so that both North and South Korea could finally conduct a planned inter-Korean railway survey. In November 2008, North Korea shut down the railroad link between North and South Korea. However, railroad transportation from South Korea to North Korea resumed again on 30 November 2018, when a South Korean train carrying railroad inspectors entered North Korea. The same day, 30 officials from North and South Korea began an 18-day survey in both Koreas to connect the Korean railroads.

The survey, which had previously been obstructed by the Korean Demilitarized Zone's (DMZ) "frontline" guard posts and landmines located at the DMZ's Arrowhead Hill, consists of a 400-kilometre (248-mile) railroad section between Kaesong and Sinuiju that cuts through the North's central region and northeastern coast. The inter-Korean survey, as well as the railroad ground-breaking ceremony which will follow to symbolize the opening of the new inter-Korean railroad and road in this area, were both objectives of the Pyongyang Agreement. On 30 November 2018, councils of Gangwon and Gyeongui Provinces met at the Dorasan Station in Paju to include the railroad survey as one of many local projects.

On 5 December 2018, the survey of the Gyeongui (Seoul-Sinuiju) railway line was completed. On 8 December 2018, an inter-Korean survey began for the Donghae railway. South Korean railway inspectors traveled into North Korea by bus before the survey began. Plans have also been made to extend the inter-Korean road surveying to include the road connecting Goseong in South Korea's Gangwon Province and Wonsan in North Korea’s Kangwon Province A joint inter-Korean survey of the road in North Korea which connects Kaesong to Pyongyang was previously conducted in August 2018.

On 13 December, it was announced that the groundbreaking ceremony to symbolize the reconnection of the roads and railways in both Koreas will be held on 26 December 2018 in Kaesong. On 17 December 2018, the latest inter-Korean railway survey, which involved an 800-kilometer rail from Kumgangsan near the inter-Korean border to the Tumen River bordering Russia in the east, was completed. South Korean inspectors afterwards returned home by bus. A threat to the groundbreaking ceremony emerged after it was revealed that the North Korean railway was in poor condition. On 21 December 2018, however, the United States agreed to no longer obstruct plans by both Koreas to hold a groundbreaking ceremony. The same day, a four day inter-Korean road survey began when ten working-level South Korean surveyors entered North Korea to work with ten North Korean surveyors on a three day survey 100-kilometer-long section on the eastern Donghae Line. On 24 December 2018, the four-day survey was completed after a separate team of ten South Korean surveyors entered North Korea and joined ten North Korean surveyors to survey a 4-kilometer-long road in Kaesong. On 26 December 2018, the groundbreaking ceremony was held as scheduled in Kaesong. About 100 South Korean officials attended the ceremony after traveling to North Korea by train.

Military MDL crossing
On 12 December 2018, soldiers from both Koreas crossed the MDL into the opposition countries for the first time in history. These soldiers, numbers in the dozens, helped verify the destruction of "frontline" guard posts.  The verification of the guard post removal was also an objective of the Comprehensive Military Agreement.  Accompanying these soldiers were inspectors who confirmed the destruction and disarmament of "frontline" guard posts, as well as the destruction of underground facilities near the guard posts.

Joint Remains Recovery Project
On April 1, 2019, excavation work along the DMZ for Korean War remains began. However, the agreed inter-Korean project did not take place, as South Korea was working alone. On May 8, 2019, the US Defense Department suspended the remains recovery project.

See also
 2018–19 Korean peace process
 Inter-Korean summits
 Peace Treaty on Korean Peninsula
 April 2018 inter-Korean summit
 May 2018 inter-Korean summit
 2018 North Korea–United States Singapore Summit
 North Korea–South Korea relations
 Korean reunification
 Northern Limit Line
 2017–18 North Korea crisis
 Inter-Korean House of Freedom
 List of international trips made by Kim Jong-un
 Kim–Xi meetings

References

2018 conferences
Inter-Korean summit
Inter-Korean summit
Inter-Korean summit
Aftermath of the Korean War
Inter-Korean summit
Kim Jong-un
Moon Jae-in Government
North Korea–South Korea relations
Politics of Korea
Inter-Korean summit